The Kandrich, at , is the highest mountain in the Bingen Forest. It is near Daxweiler in the county of Bad Kreuznach in the German state of Rhineland-Palatinate.

Geography 
The Kandrich lies in the northern tip of the county of Bad Kreuznach and within the parish of Daxweiler. It is located about 3.5 kilometres north-northwest of this village and 3.7 kilometres north-northeast of  Seibersbach. In the neighbouring county of Rhein-Hunsrück-Kreis lies the villages of Dichtelbach, 3 kilometres to the northwest and Rheinböllen, 4.2 kilometres to the west-northwest (as the crow flies). The Nahe tributary of the Guldenbach runs past the mountain to the southwest. The northeastern spur of the mountain is the Ohligsberg (604.1 m) and its southwestern spur is the Hammerberg (583.6 m).

Parts of the protected area, Rheingebiet von Bingen bis Koblenz (CDDA-No. 323852; 1978 established in 1978; 403.28 km²), covers the mountain.

References

External links 

Windkraftwerk Kandrich (kandrich.de)
Kandrich hiking trails (stromberg.de; pdf file; 3.98 MB)

Mountains under 1000 metres
Bad Kreuznach (district)
Mountains and hills of the Hunsrück